Mehriban Arif gizi Aliyeva (born 26 August 1964) is an Azerbaijani politician and physician who is the vice president and First Lady of Azerbaijan.

She is married to Ilham Aliyev, the president of Azerbaijan. Aliyev created the position of vice president in 2017 and appointed his wife to the position.

Early life, family and marriage 
Mehriban Aliyeva (née Pashayeva) was born in Baku, and is from a family described in leaked US Embassy cables as "the single most powerful family in Azerbaijan." Her grandfather was the writer Mir Jalal Pashayev, an Iranian Azerbaijani born in Iran. Her uncle Hafiz Pashayev was Azerbaijan's first Ambassador to the United States. Aliyeva's father Arif Pashayev is Rector of the National Aviation Academy in Baku, and her mother, Aida Imanguliyeva (1939–1992) was a philologist and Arabist, daughter of the journalist and pedagogue Nasir Imanguliyev.

Mehriban Aliyeva married Ilham Aliyev, the son of Heydar Aliyev, in Baku on 22 December 1983. The Aliyevs have two daughters, Leyla (born 3 July 1984) and Arzu (born 23 January 1989) and a son Heydar (born 2 August 1997). Leyla  is the editor of Baku magazine, published by Azerbaijani Russian businessman Aras Agalarov, and was married to his son Emin Agalarov.

Education and early career 
Aliyeva finished secondary school number 23 in 1982. She entered the Preventive-Treatment Faculty of the Azerbaijan Medical University, in which she excelled, and later continued her studies at the Sechenov Moscow Medical Academy, from which she graduated in 1988. From 1988–92, Mehriban Aliyeva worked at the State Research Institute of Eye Diseases of the Russian Academy of Medical Sciences in Moscow, which was led by Dr. Mikhail Krasnov. Aliyeva got her PhD after defending a thesis on “Euthanasia and humanism issues in medicine” in 2005. Two articles in The Times in 2005 described her as a "qualified physician"  and "former eye doctor."

Career

In 1995, she established the Azerbaijani Culture Friends Foundation. In 1996, she founded the magazine "Azerbaijan - Heritage" published in three languages (Azerbaijani, English and Russian) in order to promote Azerbaijani culture.

Aliyeva established on 10 May 2004 the Heydar Aliyev Foundation, which focuses on studying and holding events to promote Heydar Aliyev's political ideology. In Azerbaijan, according to a recent news article, "The HAF builds more schools than Azerbaijan's Ministry of Education, more hospitals than the Ministry of Health, and conducts more cultural events than the Ministry of Culture." The Heydar Aliyev Foundation also sponsors projects outside Azerbaijan, including helping to finance renovations at the Louvre Museum, Palace of Versailles, and  Strasbourg Cathedral.

She is  UNESCO Goodwill Ambassador, and Goodwill Ambassador of ISESCO. She was a member of the Executive Committee of the National Olympic Committee of Azerbaijan at the 4th General Assembly of the NOC on 28 December 2004.

Since 2004, she is a member of the Political Board of the New Azerbaijan Party. She was selected as the deputy chairperson of the Party in June 2013. She was appointed by her husband as the chairperson of the Organizing Committee for the 1st European Games in Baku.

Member of Parliament 
In Azerbaijan's 2005 parliamentary elections, she was elected to the National Assembly of Azerbaijan. Her candidacy was run by the New Azerbaijan Party from the Azizbeyov Second Constituency №14, was elected to the Parliament with 92.12% of the votes. She had previously broken with tradition to help campaign for her husband in 2003, when he ran for President of Azerbaijan. The Sunday Times, writing in 2005 about Aliyeva's decision to run for the Azerbaijani parliament, described her as already wielding "considerable influence," and the Heydar Aliyev Foundation as "a powerful and wealthy institution set up to safeguard the late president’s legacy and support a number of educational and charitable projects." She was nominated from Khazar Constituency №14 in 2010 and 2015 parliamentary elections and gained 94.49% of the votes in 2010, 96.7% in 2015.

During her MP period, Mehriban Aliyeva appealed to Milli Majlis for the adoption of amnesty acts on 28 May – Republic Day. As a result, in 2007, 2009, 2013 and 2016, more than 30,000 prisoners were released from different sentences.

She became the head of Azerbaijan-France working group on inter-parliamentary relations according to the decision of Milli Majlis on 4 March 2016.

Vice president 

On 21 February 2017, she was appointed First Vice President of Azerbaijan by her husband Ilham Aliyev, the president and authoritarian leader of Azerbaijan. If her husband would step down, she would become President of Azerbaijan. This was an office that was created through a constitutional referendum in 2016 which Ilham Aliyev had ordered. The referendum also lowered the age requirement for president, making it possible for Aliyev's son, then 19 years old, to become president. Critics said these changes were intended to consolidate the family's dynastic rule.

Criticism
Freedom House reports that Heydar Aliyev Foundation headed by Aliyeva since its creation in 2014, while supporting cultural projects domestically and abroad, has been focusing on "burnishing the regime’s international image and advancing Baku’s official position on the disputed territory of Nagorno-Karabakh". It has also been criticized as a vehicle for corruption.

Political repression
Aliyeva has claimed that Azerbaijan is a land of political tolerance and denied claims of mass political imprisonment. When asked about the plight of imprisoned journalist Khadija Ismayilova and human rights advocate Leyla Yunus, Mehriban did not respond. Her appointment as vice president coincided with the detention of more opposition party activists, which may have been an attempt to stifle any attempts to protest the move.  In Azerbaijan, power is concentrated in the hands of Aliyev and his extended family, and human rights violations include torture, arbitrary arrests, as well as harassment of journalists and non-governmental organizations.

Personal life

Aliyeva has undergone extensive plastic surgery. During a Baku visit, US officials claimed to be unable to immediately distinguish Aliyeva from her two daughters Arzu and Leyla thanks to the extensive operations.

Awards and honours

National honours and medals
  – The Public Figure of 2004
  – Heydar Aliyev Order
  – The Person of 2005
  – Woman of Year (2005)
  – The Person of 2015
  – Cossack Glory
 – Academician Mikayil Huseynov Medal (2017)
 – Uzeir Hajibeyli honorary medal

Foreign honours
  – Legion of Honour
  – Honorary Diploma of the State of Kuwait
  – Hilal-e-Pakistan
  –  Order of Merit of the Republic of Poland
  – Sretenjski Orden
  – 'Ruby Cross' Order of Philanthropists of the Century International Charity Foundation of Russia
  – Golden Heart International Award
  – Order of "For Services to Astrakhan Region"
  –  Gold Medal of the Crans Montana Forum
  –  “Prix de la Fondation” Prize of the Crans Montana Forum
  –  "The Symbol of Humanism - The Person of 2012"
  –  Martyr Benazir Bhutto Woman Perfection Prize - 2013
  –  Elpida Award
  – Commander's Cross Order of Merit of the Republic of Hungary
  – Diploma of an honorary citizen of Veliko Tyrnovo
  – Saint Princess Olga Order of 2nd degree of the Russian Orthodox Church
 – Knight Grand Cross of the Order of Merit of the Italian Republic (12 July 2018)
 – Order of Friendship (13 August 2019)
 – Order of Pope Pius IX, Dame Grand Cross  (22 February 2020)

International organizations 
 UNESCO Goodwill Ambassador
 Goodwill Ambassador of ISESCO
Ihsan Doğramacı Family Health Foundation Prize
UNESCO Mozart Medal
High Order of the European Olympic Committee

Honorary degrees
  – Honorary doctor of the Veliko Tarnovo University
  – Honorary Professor of the I.M. Sechenov First Moscow State Medical University
  – Honorary doctor of the Israel Medical Academy

References

External links

 Mehriban Aliyeva's Official Website
 Azerbaijans first lady. A role model for Muslim women. (The Washington Times)
 timesonline.co.uk on Mehriban Aliyeva

|-

1964 births
Living people
21st-century Azerbaijani politicians
21st-century Azerbaijani women politicians
Mehriban Aliyeva
Azerbaijani ophthalmologists
Azerbaijani people of Iranian descent
Azerbaijani women physicians
First ladies of Azerbaijan
Members of the National Assembly (Azerbaijan)
New Azerbaijan Party politicians
Officiers of the Légion d'honneur
People named in the Panama Papers
Physicians from Baku
Recipients of Hilal-i-Pakistan
Recipients of the Heydar Aliyev Order
Recipients of the Presidential Order of Excellence
Women members of the National Assembly (Azerbaijan)
UNESCO Goodwill Ambassadors
Vice presidents of Azerbaijan
Women vice presidents
Ihsan Doğramacı Family Health Foundation Prize laureates